In Conversation With is a series of BBC Radio 4 programmes that have been broadcast since 1999.

In each programme, Paul Jackson interviews a comedian, group of comedians, or someone connected with comedy.

It was researched by Mike Haskins, and has been produced by Jo Clegg, Chris Neill, Mario Stylionides, Katie Marsden.

List of episodes

Series 1

S01 E01 - Caroline Aherne (7 October 1999)
S01 E02 - Tim Brooke-Taylor and Graeme Garden (14 October 1999)
S01 E03 - Ben Elton (21 October 1999)
S01 E04 - Penelope Keith (28 October 1999)
S01 E05 - Adrian Edmondson (4 November 1999)
S01 E06 - Ronnie Corbett (11 November 1999)

Series 2

S02 E01 - Jack Dee (6 April 2000)
S02 E02 - Dave Allen (13 April 2000)
S02 E03 - Richard Curtis (20 April 2000)
S02 E04 - Meera Syal (27 April 2000)
S02 E05 - Barry Cryer (4 May 2000)
S02 E06 - Dale Winton (11 May 2000)
S02 E07 - Phill Jupitus (18 May 2000)
S02 E08 - Sandi Toksvig (25 May 2000)

Series 3

S03 E01 - Steve Coogan (8 March 2001)
S03 E02 - Des O'Connor (15 March 2001)
S03 E03 - Ruby Wax (22 March 2001)
S03 E04 - Galton and Simpson (29 March 2001)
S03 E05 - Mel and Sue (5 April 2001)
S03 E06 - Nick Hancock (12 April 2001)

Series 4

S04 E01 - The League of Gentlemen (7 March 2002)
S04 E02 - Victoria Wood (14 March 2002)
S04 E03 - Paul Whitehouse (21 March 2002)
S04 E04 - Eamonn Holmes (28 March 2002)
S04 E05 - Armando Iannucci (4 April 2002)
S04 E06 - Roy Hudd (11 April 2002)

Series 5

S05 E01 - Bruce Forsyth (19 June 2003)
S05 E02 - Ricky Gervais (26 June 2003)
S05 E03 - Michael Parkinson (3 July 2003)
S05 E04 - Rob Brydon (10 July 2003)
S05 E05 - Jenny Eclair (17 July 2003)
S05 E06 - Graham Norton (24 July 2003)

References

BBC Radio 4 programmes
British talk radio programmes